Jean-Nicolas Bouilly (24 January 1763 – 14 April 1842) was a French playwright, librettist, children's writer, and politician of the French Revolution. He is best known for writing a libretto, supposedly based on a true story, about a woman who disguises herself as a man to rescue her husband from prison, which formed the basis of Beethoven's opera Fidelio as well as a number of other operas.

Life 
Bouilly was born near Tours, and was briefly a lawyer for the Parlement de Paris. At the outbreak of the Revolution he held office under the new government and was head of the military commission in Tours during the Reign of Terror.

In 1795, he served as a member of the Committee of Public Instruction having a considerable share in the organization of primary education, but retired from public life four years later in order to devote himself to literature. Bouilly died in Paris.

Works 
Theatre
1790: Pierre le Grand, comedy in 4 acts  and in prose,mingled with  singing, music by André Grétry, Comédie Italienne, 13 January
1790: Jean-Jacques Rousseau à ses derniers moments, historical trait in 1 act and in prose, Comédie Italienne, 31 December read online
1798: Léonore, ou L’amour conjugal, historical fact in 2 acts and in prose mingled with songs, music by Pierre Gaveaux, created at the Théâtre Feydeau 19 February Read online The play formed the basis for the libretto which Ludwig van Beethoven used for the opera Fidelio; it was also set by Pierre Gaveaux as Léonore, ou L’amour conjugal, by Simon Mayr as L'amor coniugale, and by Ferdinando Paer as Leonora.
1797: La Mort de Turenne, historical and military play with extravaganza, in 3 acts, mingled with pantomimes, fights and evolutions, with Jean-Guillaume-Antoine Cuvelier, Théâtre de la Cité, 11 June
1796: René Descartes, historical trait in 2 acts and in prose, Théâtre-Français, 20 September Read online
1796: La Famille américaine, comedy in 1 act and in prose, mingled with songs, music by Nicolas Dalayrac, Comédie Italienne, 17 February
1799: Le Tombeau de Turenne, ou l'Armée du Rhin à Saspach, historical fact in 1 act, mingled with vaudevilles, pantomimes, dances and military evolutions, with Jean-Guillaume-Antoine Cuvelier and Hector Chaussier, Palais des Variétés, 8 January
1799: L'Abbé de L'Épée, historical comedy in 5 acts and in prose, Théâtre-Français, 14 December Read online
1800: Les Deux Journées, comédie lyrique in 3 acts, music by Luigi Cherubini, Théâtre of the Opéra-Comique, 15 January
1800: Zoé, ou la Pauvre Petite, opera in 1 act, music by Charles-Henri Plantade, Théâtre de l'Opéra-Comique, 3 July
1800: Téniers, comedy in 1 act and in prose, mingled with vaudevilles, with Joseph Pain, Théâtre du Vaudeville, 18 October
1800: Florian, comedy in 1 act, in prose, mingled with vaudevilles, with Joseph-Marie Pain, Théâtre du Vaudeville, 18 December
1801: Berquin, ou l'Ami des enfants, comedy in 1 act, on prose, mingled with vaudevilles, with Joseph-Marie Pain, Théâtre du Vaudeville, 7 December Read online
1802: Une Folie, comedy in 2 acts, mingled with songs, music by Étienne-Nicolas Méhul, Théâtre de l'Opéra-Comique, 4 April 
1803: Fanchon la vielleuse, comedy in 3 acts, mingled with vaudevilles, with Joseph-Marie Pain, Théâtre du Vaudeville, 16 January Read online
1803: Héléna, opera in 3 acts, music by Étienne-Nicolas Méhul, Théâtre de l'Opéra-Comique, 1 March
1804: Le Désastre de Lisbonne, heroical drama in 3 acts, in prose, mingled with dance and pantomime, music by Alexandre Piccini, Théâtre de la Porte-Saint-Martin, 24 November Read online
1805: L'Intrigue aux fenêtres, opera bouffon in 1 act, with Emmanuel Dupaty, music by Nicolas Isouard, Théâtre de l'Opéra-Comique, 25 February Read online
1805: Madame de Sévigné, comedy in 3 acts and in prose, Théâtre-Français, 6 June Read online
1806: Les Français dans le Tyrol, historical fact, in 1 act and in prose, Théâtre-Français, 1 February
1806: Agnès Sorel, comedy in 3 acts mingled with vaudevilles, with Emmanuel Dupaty, Théâtre du Vaudeville, 9 April
1808: Haine aux femmes, comedy in 1 act, mingled with vaudevilles, Théâtre du Vaudeville, 23 February
1809: Françoise de Foix, opera comique in 3 acts, with Emmanuel Dupaty, music by Henri Montan Berton, Théâtre de l'Opéra-Comique, 28 January
1809: Le Petit courrier, ou Commé les femmes se vengent, comedy in 2 acts, in prose, mingled with vaudevilles, with Charles-François-Jean-Baptiste Moreau de Commagny, Théâtre du Vaudeville, 20 April
1810: La Vieillesse de Piron, comedy in 1 act, in prose, mingled with vaudevilles, with Joseph-Marie Pain, Théâtre du Vaudeville, 9 April
1811: La Belle au bois dormant, féerie-vaudeville in 2 acts, with Théophile Marion Dumersan, Théâtre du Vaudeville, 20 February
1812: Robert le diable, comedy in 2 acts, mingled with vaudevilles, with Théophile Marion Dumersan, Théâtre du Vaudeville, 31 December
1813: Le Séjour militaire, opera comique in 1 act, music by Auber, Théâtre de l'Opéra-Comique, 27 February
1817: Le Prince en goguette, ou la Faute et la leçon, comedy in 2 acts and in prose, mingled with couplets, music by Marc-Antoine Désaugiers, Théâtre du Vaudeville, 21 April
1818: Les Jeux floraux, opera in 3 acts, music by Léopold Aimon, Académie royale de musique, 16 November
1822: Valentine de Milan, drame lyrique in 3 acts, posthumous music by Étienne-Nicolas Méhul, score completed by Joseph Daussoigne, Théâtre de l'Opéra-Comique, 28 November
1829: Les Deux Nuits, opera comique in 3 acts, with Eugène Scribe, music by François Adrien Boieldieu, Théâtre de l'Opéra-Comique, 20 May
1832: Le Bandeau, comédie en vaudeville in 1 act, with Louis-Émile Vanderburch, Théâtre du Gymnase-Dramatique, 21 May
1833: Guido Reni, ou les Artistes, drama in 5 acts, with Antony Béraud, Comédie-Française, 6 February 
Tales
1807: Causeries d'un vieillard,
1819: Contes à ma fille,
1811: Conseils à ma fille Read online  
1817: Les Jeunes Femmes, 2 vol.
1817: Annales de la jeunesse, with M. et Mme Hyacinthe Azaïs, by Rougemont and Lefebvre,
1817: Les Encouragements de la jeunesse read online
1823: Les Mères de famille, 2 vol.
1824–1825: Contes offerts aux enfants de France, 2 vol.,
1827: Contes à mes petites amies, ou Trois Mois en Touraine, 1827 Texte en ligne
1829–1831 Le Portefeuille de la jeunesse, ou la Morale et l'histoire enseignées par des exemples, précédé d'un discours sur l'ensemble de l'ouvrage, 20 vol., 
1830: Contes populaires, read online  
1835: Les Adieux du vieux conteur,
1836: Alfred et Nathalie, ou les Coupables supposés,
1838: Nouvelles Causeries d'un vieillard,
1846: La Discrétion,
1846: Petits Contes d'une mère à ses enfants,
1877: Nouveaux conseils à ma fille, Read online 
1883: Contes moraux pour les jeunes élèves, read on line 
1884: Geneviève et Marcelin, ou les Jumeaux de la Beauce. La Charrette à bras, Read online
1884: Le Dévouement filial, ou la Chanteuse volée, Read online
1885: La Petite Gouvernante, suivie d'autres épisodes, Read online
1886: Causeries pour la jeunesse, read online
1886: Causeries et nouvelles causeries, Read online
Varia
1836–1837: Mes Récapitulations, 3 vol.,
1837: Explication des douze écussons qui représentent les emblèmes et les symboles des douze grades philosophiques du rite écossais dit ancien et accepté, par l'ill.* F.* Bouilly,
1838: Nouvelles Récapitulations, 
1842: Soixante ans du Théâtre-Français, par un amateur, né en 1769, 
undated: Le Vieux Glaneur, ou de Tout un peu, poems.

In 1836 he published an autobiography.

Quote 
"Whatever we possess becomes of double value when we have the opportunity of sharing it with others."

References

External links 
 
 
  
 Bouilly article on the CÉSAR site

1763 births
1842 deaths
People from Joué-lès-Tours
18th-century French dramatists and playwrights
18th-century French writers
18th-century French male writers
19th-century French dramatists and playwrights
Writers from Centre-Val de Loire
French children's writers
French male non-fiction writers
French male short story writers
French memoirists
19th-century French politicians
French opera librettists
French short story writers
People of the French Revolution
19th-century memoirists